Homewood Park is a populated place in Yellowstone County, Montana situated near the old Baseline train stop on Grand Avenue. The community is a "West End" subdivision within the greater Billings Metro Area and uses a Billings postal ZIP code (59106).

References

Populated places in Yellowstone County, Montana